Luciano Aquino (born January 26, 1985) is a Canadian-born Italian professional ice hockey player. He is currently an unrestricted free agent who most recently played with EC Red Bull Salzburg of the Austrian Hockey League (EBEL). Aquino was selected by the New York Islanders in the 7th round (210th overall) of the 2005 NHL Entry Draft.

Playing career
Aquino played major junior hockey in the Ontario Hockey League with the Brampton Battalion where, from 2004-05 to 2005-06, he played 97 games collecting 53 goals and 90 assists for 143 points.

In his second season with Dornbirner EC of the Austrian Hockey League in 2013–14, Aquino led the club and the EBEL in scoring with 49 assists and 79 points in 53 games. Having excelled in the EBEL, Aquino secured a move to the SHL on a one-year contract with Färjestad BK on May 2, 2014.

Awards and honours

Career statistics

References

External links

1985 births
Living people
Asiago Hockey 1935 players
Bridgeport Sound Tigers players
Canadian ice hockey right wingers
Dornbirn Bulldogs players
EC Red Bull Salzburg players
ERC Ingolstadt players
Färjestad BK players
Fort Wayne Komets players
HC Valpellice players
Ice hockey people from Ontario
New York Islanders draft picks
Pensacola Ice Pilots players
Reading Royals players
Sportspeople from Mississauga
Trenton Titans players
Utah Grizzlies (ECHL) players
Canadian expatriate ice hockey players in Austria
Canadian expatriate ice hockey players in Italy
Canadian expatriate ice hockey players in Germany
Canadian expatriate ice hockey players in Sweden
Brampton Battalion players
Maine Black Bears men's ice hockey players